Nor Artamet is a village in the Kotayk Province of Armenia.

See also 
Kotayk Province

References

Populated places in Kotayk Province